The Acado virus (ACDV) is a serotype of Corriparta virus in the genus Orbivirus in the Corriparta serogroup. Isolated from Culex antennatus and C. univittatus neavi in Ethiopia. Not reported to cause disease in humans.

References

Orbiviruses
Infraspecific virus taxa